Cognitive liberty, or the "right to mental self-determination", is the freedom of an individual to control their own mental processes, cognition, and consciousness. It has been argued to be both an extension of, and the principle underlying, the right to freedom of thought. Though a relatively recently defined concept, many theorists see cognitive liberty as being of increasing importance as technological advances in neuroscience allow for an ever-expanding ability to directly influence consciousness. Cognitive liberty is not a recognized right in any international human rights treaties, but has gained a limited level of recognition in the United States, and is argued to be the principle underlying a number of recognized rights.

Overview

The term "cognitive liberty" was coined by neuroethicist Dr. Wrye Sententia and legal theorist and lawyer Richard Glen Boire, the founders and directors of the non-profit Center for Cognitive Liberty and Ethics (CCLE).  Sententia and Boire define cognitive liberty as "the right of each individual to think independently and autonomously, to use the full power of his or her mind, and to engage in multiple modes of thought."

Sententia and Boire conceived of the concept of cognitive liberty as a response to the increasing ability of technology to monitor and manipulate cognitive function, and the corresponding increase in the need to ensure individual cognitive autonomy and privacy. Sententia divides the practical application of cognitive liberty into two principles:

As long as their behavior does not endanger others, individuals should not be compelled against their will to use technologies that directly interact with the brain or be forced to take certain psychoactive drugs.
As long as they do not subsequently engage in behavior that harms others, individuals should not be prohibited from, or criminalized for, using new mind-enhancing drugs and technologies.

These two facets of cognitive liberty are reminiscent of Timothy Leary's "Two Commandments for the Molecular Age", from his 1968 book The Politics of Ecstasy:

Supporters of cognitive liberty therefore seek to impose both a negative and a positive obligation on states: to refrain from non-consensually interfering with an individual's cognitive processes, and to allow individuals to self-determine their own "inner realm" and control their own mental functions.

Freedom from interference

This first obligation, to refrain from non-consensually interfering with an individual's cognitive processes, seeks to protect individuals from having their mental processes altered or monitored without their consent or knowledge, "setting up a defensive wall against unwanted intrusions".  Ongoing improvements to neurotechnologies such as transcranial magnetic stimulation and electroencephalography (or "brain fingerprinting"); and to pharmacology in the form of selective serotonin reuptake inhibitors (SSRIs), nootropics, modafinil and other psychoactive drugs, are continuing to increase the ability to both monitor and directly influence human cognition. As a result, many theorists have emphasized the importance of recognizing cognitive liberty in order to protect individuals from the state using such technologies to alter those individuals’ mental processes: "states must be barred from invading the inner sphere of persons, from accessing their thoughts, modulating their emotions or manipulating their personal preferences."  These specific ethical concerns regarding the use of neuroscience technologies to interfere or invade the brain form the fields of neuroethics and neuroprivacy.

This element of cognitive liberty has been raised in relation to a number of state-sanctioned interventions in individual cognition, from the mandatory psychiatric 'treatment' of homosexuals in the US before the 1970s, to the non-consensual administration of psychoactive drugs to unwitting US citizens during CIA Project MKUltra, to the forcible administration of mind-altering drugs on individuals to make them competent to stand trial. Futurist and bioethicist George Dvorsky, chair of the Board of the Institute for Ethics and Emerging Technologies has identified this element of cognitive liberty as being of relevance to the debate around the curing of autism spectrum conditions. Duke University School of Law Professor Nita A. Farahany has also proposed legislative protection of cognitive liberty as a way of safeguarding the protection from self-incrimination found in the Fifth Amendment to the US Constitution, in the light of the increasing ability to access human memory.

Though this element of cognitive liberty is often defined as an individual's freedom from state interference with human cognition, Jan Christoph Bublitz and Reinhard Merkel among others suggest that cognitive liberty should also prevent other, non-state entities from interfering with an individual's mental "inner realm". Bublitz and Merkel propose the introduction of a new criminal offense punishing "interventions severely interfering with another’s mental integrity by undermining mental control or exploiting pre-existing mental weakness." Direct interventions that reduce or impair cognitive capacities such as memory, concentration, and willpower; alter preferences, beliefs, or behavioral dispositions; elicit inappropriate emotions; or inflict clinically identifiable mental injuries would all be prima facie impermissible and subject to criminal prosecution. Sententia and Boire have also expressed concern that corporations and other non-state entities might utilize emerging neurotechnologies to alter individuals' mental processes without their consent.

Freedom to self-determine
Where the first obligation seeks to protect individuals from interference with cognitive processes by the state, corporations or other individuals, this second obligation seeks to ensure that individuals have the freedom to alter or enhance their own consciousness. An individual who enjoys this aspect of cognitive liberty has the freedom to alter their mental processes in any way they wish to; whether through indirect methods such as meditation, yoga or prayer; or through direct cognitive intervention through psychoactive drugs or neurotechnology.

As psychotropic drugs are a powerful method of altering cognitive function, many advocates of cognitive liberty are also advocates of drug law reform; claiming that the "war on drugs" is in fact a "war on mental states". The CCLE, as well as other cognitive liberty advocacy groups such as Cognitive Liberty UK, have lobbied for the re-examination and reform of prohibited drug law; one of the CCLE's key guiding principles is that: "governments should not criminally prohibit cognitive enhancement or the experience of any mental state". Calls for reform of restrictions on the use of prescription cognitive-enhancement drugs (also called smart drugs or nootropics) such as Prozac, Ritalin and Adderall have also been made on the grounds of cognitive liberty.

This element of cognitive liberty is also of great importance to proponents of the transhumanist movement, a key tenet of which is the enhancement of human mental function. Dr Wrye Sententia has emphasized the importance of cognitive liberty in ensuring the freedom to pursue human mental enhancement, as well as the freedom to choose against enhancement. Sententia argues that the recognition of a "right to (and not to) direct, modify, or enhance one's thought processes" is vital to the free application of emerging neurotechnology to enhance human cognition; and that something beyond the current conception of freedom of thought is needed. Sententia claims that "cognitive liberty's strength is that it protects those who do want to alter their brains, but also those who do not".

Relationship with recognized human rights
Cognitive liberty is not currently recognized as a human right by any international human rights treaty. While freedom of thought is recognized by Article 18 of the Universal Declaration of Human Rights (UDHR), freedom of thought can be distinguished from cognitive liberty in that the former is concerned with protecting an individual's freedom to think whatever they want, whereas cognitive liberty is concerned with protecting an individual's freedom to think however they want. Cognitive liberty seeks to protect an individual's right to determine their own state of mind and be free from external control over their state of mind, rather than just protecting the content of an individuals’ thoughts. 
It has been suggested that the lack of protection of cognitive liberty in previous human rights instruments was due to the relative lack of technology capable of directly interfering with mental autonomy at the time the core human rights treaties were created. As the human mind was considered invulnerable to direct manipulation, control or alteration, it was deemed unnecessary to expressly protect individuals from unwanted mental interference. With modern advances in neuroscience and in anticipation of its future development however, it is argued that such express protection is becoming increasingly necessary.

Cognitive liberty then can be seen as an extension of or an "update" to the right to freedom of thought as it has been traditionally understood.  Freedom of thought should now be understood to include the right to determine one's own mental state as well as the content of one's thoughts. However, some have instead argued that cognitive liberty is already an inherent part of the international human rights framework as the principle underlying the rights to freedom of thought, expression and religion. The freedom to think in whatever manner one chooses is a "necessary precondition to those guaranteed freedoms." Daniel Waterman and Casey William Hardison have argued that cognitive liberty is fundamental to Freedom of Thought because it encompasses the ability to have certain types of experiences, including the right to experience altered or non-ordinary states of consciousness. It has also been suggested that cognitive liberty can be seen to be a part of the inherent dignity of human beings as recognized by Article 1 of the UDHR.

Most proponents of cognitive liberty agree however that cognitive liberty should be expressly recognized as a human right in order to properly provide protection for individual cognitive autonomy.

Legal recognition

In the United States

Richard Glen Boire of the Center for Cognitive Liberty and Ethics filed an amicus brief with the US Supreme Court in the case of Sell v. United States, in which the Supreme Court examined whether the court had the power to make an order to forcibly administer antipsychotic medication to an individual who had refused such treatment, for the sole purpose of making them competent to stand trial.

In the United Kingdom
In the case of R v Hardison, the defendant, charged with eight counts under the Misuse of Drugs Act 1971 (MDA), including the production of DMT and LSD, claimed that cognitive liberty was safeguarded by Article 9 of the European Convention on Human Rights. Hardison argued that "individual sovereignty over one's interior environment constitutes the very core of what it means to be free", and that as psychotropic drugs are a potent method of altering an individual's mental process, prohibition of them under the MDA was in opposition to Article 9. The court however disagreed, calling Hardison's arguments a "portmanteau defense" and relying upon the UN Drug Conventions and the earlier case of R v Taylor to deny Hardison's right to appeal to a superior court. Hardison was convicted and given a 20-year prison sentence, though he was released on 29 May 2013 after nine years in prison.

Criticism

While there has been little publicized criticism of the concept of cognitive liberty itself, drug policy reform and the concept of human enhancement, both closely linked to cognitive liberty, remain highly controversial issues.
The recent development of neurosciences is increasing the possibility of controlling and influence specific mental functions. The risks inherent in removing restrictions on controlled cognitive-enhancing drugs, including of widening the gap between those able to afford such treatments and those unable to do so, have caused many to remain skeptical about the wisdom of recognizing cognitive liberty as a right. Political philosopher and Harvard University professor Michael J. Sandel, when examining the prospect of memory enhancement, wrote that "some who worry about the ethics of cognitive enhancement point to the danger of creating two classes of human beings – those with access to enhancement technologies, and those who must make do with an unaltered memory that fades with age." Cognitive liberty then faces opposition obliquely in these interrelated debates. But these objections to cognitive enhancement have not gone unchallenged and debate continues still.

See also

 Cognitive ergonomics
 Drug liberalization
 Freedom of religion
 Freedom of speech
 Morphological freedom
 Neuroenhancement
 Neuroethics
 Neurolaw
 Personalized medicine
 Psychonautics
 Responsible drug use
 The Rhetoric of Drugs, by Jacques Derrida
 Self-ownership
 Techno-progressivism
 Thomas Szasz
 Transhumanism

References

Human rights
Civil rights and liberties
Identity politics
Medical ethics
Drug culture
Transhumanism
Psychedelics, dissociatives and deliriants